Top Aghaj (also Romanized as Tūp Āghāj) is a city in Seylatan Rural District, in the Central District of Bijar County, Kurdistan Province, Iran. At the 2006 census, its population was 2,172, in 517 families. The city is populated by Turkics.

References 

Towns and villages in Bijar County
Azerbaijani settlements in Kurdistan Province